János Faragó (8 July 1946 – 14 November 1984) was a Hungarian athlete. He competed in the men's discus throw at the 1968 Summer Olympics and the 1976 Summer Olympics.

References

1946 births
1984 deaths
Athletes (track and field) at the 1968 Summer Olympics
Athletes (track and field) at the 1976 Summer Olympics
Hungarian male discus throwers
Olympic athletes of Hungary
Place of birth missing
20th-century Hungarian people